Dragoș Vodă is traditionally described as an early ruler of Moldavia.

Dragoș also may refer to:

 Dragoș (given name)
 Dragoș Vodă, Călărași, Romanian commune
 Dragoș River, in Romania

People with the surname
 Agnes Dragos, Hungarian sprint canoeist